James or Jim Holland may refer to:

James Holland (North Carolina politician) (1754–1823), U.S. Congressman from the state of North Carolina
James Holland (New Hampshire politician), member of the New Hampshire House of Representatives
James Holland (artist) (1800–1870), English landscape painter
James Holland (author) (born 1970), British historian, author and broadcaster
James Holland (soccer) (born 1989), Australian football (soccer) player
James Buchanan Holland (1857–1914), U.S. federal judge
James F. Holland (1925–2018), American physician and cancer researcher
James Job Holland (1841–1922), Liberal Party Member of Parliament in Auckland, New Zealand
James P. Holland (1865–1941), president of the New York State Federation of Labor, 1916–1926
 Jim Holland (athlete) (born 1924), US National champion long jumper
 Jim Holland (ski jumper) (born 1967), ski jumper
 James C. Holland (1853–1919), American architect in Kansas
 James V. Holland (1835–1916), American politician and businessman